The Dacang Bridge is a historic stone arch bridge over the Old City River in Songjiang District of Shanghai, China.

History
Dacang Bridge was built in 1626 during the late Ming dynasty (1368–1644). In April 2014, it has been classified as a municipal-level cultural heritage site by the Government of Shanghai.

Gallery

References

Bridges in Shanghai
Arch bridges in China
Bridges completed in 1626
Ming dynasty architecture
Buildings and structures completed in 1626
1626 establishments in China